Beypore State assembly constituency is one of the 140 state legislative assembly constituencies in Kerala state in southern India. It is also one of the 7 state legislative assembly constituencies included in the Kozhikode Lok Sabha constituency. As of the 2021 Assembly election, the current MLA is P. A. Mohammed Riyas of CPI(M).

Local self governed segments
Beypore Niyama Sabha constituency is composed of the following 14 wards of the Kozhikode Municipal Corporation (Beypore zone and Cheruvannur Nallalam zone) in Kozhikode Taluk, and 2 Municipalities and 1 Gram Panchayat in the same Taluk:

Members of Legislative Assembly 
The following list contains all members of Kerala legislative assembly who have represented the constituency:

Key

Election results 
Percentage change (±%) denotes the change in the number of votes from the immediate previous election.

Niyamasabha Election 2021 
There were 2,08,059 registered voters in the constituency for the 2021 election.

Niyamasabha Election 2016 
There were 1,91,152 registered voters in the constituency for the 2016 election.

Niyamasabha Election 2011 
There were 1,64,045 registered voters in the constituency for the 2011 election.

See also 
 Beypore
 Kozhikode district
 List of constituencies of the Kerala Legislative Assembly
 2016 Kerala Legislative Assembly election

References 

Assembly constituencies of Kerala

State assembly constituencies in Kozhikode district